Víctor Manuel Palmero Guerol (26 December 1989) is a Spanish actor.

He was born in Onda, Castellón in 1989 and he made his debut in Física o química. When he ended his role in Con el culo al aire, he worked as a waiter.

He appeared in stage plays such as Atrapados, Climax and Háblame, starring María Garralón and Mariola Fuentes, and in the TV series La que se avecina. He also appeared in the show Pasapalabra.

In 2017 he won Best Actor for his role of Alba Recio in La que se avecina in a TV online competition.

Filmography

References

External links
 

1989 births
Spanish male television actors
Spanish male stage actors
Spanish male child actors
People from Onda
Actors from the Valencian Community
Living people